Anna Robertson Brown Lindsay (1864–1948) was the first woman to earn a doctorate at the University of Pennsylvania; she had previously attended Wellesley College and Oxford University. She wrote a number of books on theological topics, most of which were published in the early-1900s. Anna Robertson Brown Lindsay was the daughter of a Presbyterian minister and the first woman to graduate with a Ph.D in English from the University of Pennsylvania.

Lindsay was married to Samuel McCune Lindsay, and they had three children.

References

125 years of Women at Penn

External links
 
 
 Anna Robertson Brown Lindsay papers at the Rare Book and Manuscript Library, Columbia University, New York, NY

1864 births
1948 deaths
American theologians
University of Pennsylvania alumni
Women Christian theologians